White Cloud Township is a township in Nodaway County, in the U.S. state of Missouri.

White Cloud Township was erected in 1845, taking its name from White Cloud Creek.

References

Townships in Missouri
Townships in Nodaway County, Missouri